Fire breathing, fire-breathing, firebreathing, fire breather, or firebreather may refer to:

 Fire-breathing monster, a mythological or fantastical monster able to breathe fire
 Fire breathing (circus act), the act of making a plume of fire by creating a precise mist of fuel from the mouth
 Firebreather (comics), a comic series about a teenage half-dragon
 Firebreather (film), 2010 animated film based on the comic